The 1964 U.S. Open was the 64th U.S. Open, held June 18–20 at the Blue Course of Congressional Country Club in Bethesda, Maryland, a suburb northwest of Washington, D.C. Ken Venturi won his only major title, four strokes ahead of runner-up Tommy Jacobs.

Jacobs held the 36-hole lead after shooting a 64 (−6) in the second round, tying the U.S. Open record at the time for a round, set by Lee Mackey in 1950. In the third round on Saturday morning, he carded an even-par 70 and retained the lead after 54 holes, two strokes ahead of Venturi, who made up four shots with a 66 (−4). Masters champion Arnold Palmer had led after the first round, but hopes of a grand slam faded with a 75 in the third.

Before the final round began on Saturday afternoon, Venturi was advised by doctors to withdraw from the tournament. He was suffering dehydration due to an oppressive heat wave and had to take treatments with tea and salt tablets in between rounds. To play the final round, doctors warned, was to risk heat stroke. Venturi, however, ignored the advice and played on, then shot a 70 to Jacobs' 76 to claim a four-stroke victory. Venturi's score of 206 over the final 54 holes set a new U.S. Open record, as did his score of 136 over the last 36. The win was his first on tour in four years.

Future champion Raymond Floyd made his U.S. Open debut this year at age 21 and finished in 14th place. He played the final two rounds on Saturday with Venturi. This was the last time the championship was scheduled for three days (the final two rounds scheduled on Saturday); the next year it was expanded to four days, concluding on Sunday.

A lack of rainfall in the previous six weeks reduced its effective length, and it played firm and fast.

Course layout

Source:

Past champions in the field

Made the cut

Missed the cut

Round summaries

First round
Thursday, June 18, 1964

Source:

Second round
Friday, June 19, 1964

Source:

Third round
Saturday, June 20, 1964  (morning)

Source:

Final round
Saturday, June 20, 1964  (afternoon)

Source:

Scorecard
Final round

Cumulative tournament scores, relative to par

Source:

Video
USGA: 1964 U.S. Open win by Venturi

References

External links
USOpen.com - 1964
USGA – Looking back: Venturi wins 1964 U.S. Open

U.S. Open (golf)
Golf in Maryland
Bethesda, Maryland
U.S. Open
U.S. Open (golf)
U.S. Open (golf)
U.S. Open (golf)